The Ozark Cavefish National Wildlife Refuge is a 40-acre (16-ha) National Wildlife Refuge located in Lawrence County, Missouri, 20 mi (32 km) west of Springfield. The United States Fish and Wildlife Service acquired the land in 1991 to protect the endangered Ozark cavefish.

Wildlife and protected species
In addition to the Ozark cavefish, Turnback Cave provides habitat for the endangered gray bat, whose droppings provide the essential nutrient source for the caves.  The refuge is closed to the public.

See also
 Mingo National Wildlife Refuge

External links
 Ozark Cavefish National Wildlife Refuge
 Recreation.gov overview
 Endangered Species Guidesheet, Missouri Department of Conservation
 Ghost Fish of the Ozarks, by Tracy Crede
 

National Wildlife Refuges in Missouri
Fauna of the Plains-Midwest (United States)
Protected areas of Lawrence County, Missouri